Thomson Road can refer to either:

Thomson Road, Singapore
Thomson Road, Hong Kong